Thylane Léna-Rose Loubry Blondeau (born 2001) is a French model. Blondeau started modeling at a very young age, and in 2007, was titled "Most Beautiful Girl in The World." She has modeled for many designers, including Dolce & Gabbana, L'Oréal and Versace.

In 2018, she founded her own clothing brand, Heaven May, and topped TC Candler's "100 Most Beautiful Faces."

Early life

Thylane Blondeau was born in 2001, in Aix-en-Provence, France. She has a younger brother, Ayrton Blondeau. Their parents Véronika and Patrick married in 2002 and divorced in 2016.

Career

Modeling
Blondeau began modelling at the age of 4, walking on the runway for French designer Jean Paul Gaultier and later for famous designers like Dolce & Gabbana, babylos, and L'Oréal. She had her first photoshoot at seven years old with photographer Dani Brubaker. She represented the French modelling agency success kids between 2005 and 2016.

When she was 10, Blondeau was involved in a controversy over the sexualisation of children in advertising and the media when she appeared in adult clothing and make-up for the Vogue Paris supplement Vogue Enfants.

At age 13, she appeared on the cover of the magazine .

In 2015, she signed with IMG Models. She walked the runway for Dolce & Gabbana.

In 2017, she became a brand ambassador for L'Oreal Paris. She starred alongside Zendaya, Lucky Blue Smith and Presley Gerber in the Dolce & Gabbana millennial-themed spring/summer 2017 campaign.

In 2018, she founded her own clothing brand, Heaven May.

In December 2018, Thylane placed first in the annual "Independent Critics List of the 100 Most Beautiful Faces of 2018". It was her fifth consecutive appearance on the prestigious global list, having been 84th in 2014, 28th in 2015, fifth in 2016, second in 2017, and fourth in 2019.

She is considered one of the shortest models, with a height of 5'6".

Acting
Blondeau made her acting debut playing the role of Gabriele in the film Belle & Sebastian: The Adventure Continues (2015).

Personal life
In October 2021, Blondeau underwent successful surgery for removal of painful ovarian cysts.

Filmography

References

External links

2001 births
Living people
French female models
French child models
IMG Models models